Robert Marshall Axelrod (born May 27, 1943) is an American political scientist. He is Professor of Political Science and Public Policy at the University of Michigan where he has been since 1974. He is best known for his interdisciplinary work on the evolution of cooperation. His current research interests include complexity theory (especially agent-based modeling), international security, and cyber security. His research includes innovative approaches to explaining conflict of interest, the emergence of norms, how game theory is used to study cooperation, and cross-disciplinary studies on evolutionary processes.

Biography
Axelrod received his  B.A. in mathematics from the University of Chicago in 1964. In 1969, he received his Ph.D. in political science from Yale University for a thesis entitled Conflict of interest: a theory of divergent goals with applications to politics. He taught at the University of California, Berkeley, from 1968 until 1974.

Among his honors and awards are membership in the National Academy of Sciences, a five-year MacArthur Prize Fellowship, the Newcomb Cleveland Prize of the American Association for the Advancement of Sciences for an outstanding contribution to science. He was elected a Fellow of the American Academy of Arts and Sciences in 1985. In 1990 Axelrod was awarded the inaugural NAS Award for Behavioral Research Relevant to the Prevention of Nuclear War from the National Academy of Sciences. He is also a faculty affiliate of the Science, Technology, and Public Policy (STPP Program) at the University of Michigan Gerald R. Ford School of Public Policy.

Recently Axelrod has consulted and lectured on promoting cooperation and harnessing complexity for the United Nations, the World Bank, the U.S. Department of Defense, and various organizations serving health care professionals, business leaders, and K–12 educators.

Axelrod was the President of the American Political Science Association (APSA) for the 2006–2007 term.  He focused his term on the theme of interdisciplinarity.

In May 2006, Axelrod was awarded an honorary degree by Georgetown University. In 2013, he was awarded the Johan Skytte Prize in Political Science. In 2014, President Barack Obama presented Axelrod with a National Medal of Science.  On May 28, 2015, he was awarded an honorary doctorate by Harvard University.

Bibliography

Books

Journal articles 
 
 
 Axelrod, Robert; Atran, S, Davis, R (2007) Sacred Barriers to Conflict Resolution, Science (317)

See also

 Cognitive map
 Evolutionarily stable strategy
 Prisoner's dilemma

References

1943 births
American political scientists
Fellows of the American Academy of Arts and Sciences
Game theorists
American international relations scholars
Living people
MacArthur Fellows
University of California, Berkeley faculty
University of Chicago alumni
University of Michigan faculty
Gerald R. Ford School of Public Policy faculty
Yale Graduate School of Arts and Sciences alumni
Members of the United States National Academy of Sciences
Jefferson Science Fellows